Mariyam Shakeela is a Maldivian physician, businesswoman, and former government Minister for Health and Family and the Minister of Environment and Energy.

Biography
Mariyam Shakeela was appointed the Minister of Environment and Energy in May 2012 by President Mohamed Waheed Hassan. She got into a minor diplomatic spat with Canadian Foreign Affairs Minister John Baird after she took a picture of him meeting Maldivian dissidents outside the Commonwealth Ministerial Action Group in New York when she was the acting Foreign Minister of Maldives in 2013. After that she was made the Minister for Health and Family in November 2013. She accused him of being biased against Maldives. During when she was in office as the Health Minister there were a series of scandals including the death of a soldier in a hospital, transfused HIV positive blood, and the interruption of a caesarean. The scandals led to calls for her resignation. She was removed from office. She said the reason for removal from the Ministry was a conspiracy by people involved with corruption in the healthcare sector of Maldives. She also reported receiving multiple death threats. She is a shareholder of SIMDI Group of companies and its Chief Executive Officer. She wrote a book of poetry called Hope Beyond Shadows of Pain.

References

Year of birth missing (living people)
Living people
People from Malé
Women government ministers of the Maldives
Health ministers of the Maldives
Environment Ministers of the Maldives
Energy ministers of the Maldives
21st-century Maldivian women politicians
21st-century Maldivian politicians